Thiri Yadanar (born on 12 September 1979) is a Burmese politician who currently serves as a member of parliament in the House of Nationalities  for Mon State № 12 constituency. She is a member of the National League for Democracy.

Early life and education 
Thiri Yadanar was born in Bilin, Mon State on September 21, 1979. She graduated with B.A. (history) from Mawlamyine University. Her former work is trader.

Political career
She is a member of the National League for Democracy. In the 2015 Myanmar general election, she contested the Mon State № 12 constituency winning a majority of 34,527 votes, won a House of Nationalities seat.

References

1979 births
Living people
People from Mon State
Members of the House of Nationalities
National League for Democracy politicians
21st-century Burmese women politicians
21st-century Burmese politicians